Marshall Benton Tymn (11 December 1937 – 24 May 2020) was an editor, academic and bibliographer of science fiction and fantasy. He received the Pilgrim Award in 1990. He was a founder of the Instructors of Science Fiction in Higher Education.

Bibliography
 A Directory of Science Fiction and Fantasy Publishing Houses and Book Dealers (1974)
 A Research Guide to Science Fiction Studies: An Annotated Checklist of Primary and Secondary Sources (1977) (with L.W. Currey and Roger C. Schlobin) 
 Index to Stories in Thematic Anthologies of Science Fiction (1978) (with L.W. Currey; Martin H. Greenberg and Joseph D. Olander)
 The Year's Scholarship in Science Fiction and Fantasy: 1972-1975 (1979) (with Roger C. Schlobin) 
 Recent Critical Studies on Fantasy Literature: An Annotated Checklist (1978)
 A Basic Reference Shelf for Science Fiction Teachers (1978)
 American Fantasy and Science Fiction: Toward a Bibliography of Works Published in the United States, 1948-1973 (1979) 
 Fantasy Literature: A Core Collection and Reference Guide (1979) (with Robert H. Boyer and Kenneth J. Zahorski)
 Horror Literature: A Core Collection and Reference Guide (1981)
 The Science Fiction Reference Book (ed.) (1981)
 A Teacher's Guide to Science Fiction (1981)
 Survey of Science Fiction Literature: Biographical Supplement (1982) 
 The Year's Scholarship in Science Fiction and Fantasy: 1976-1979 (1983) (with Roger C. Schlobin) 
 The Year's Scholarship in Science Fiction, Fantasy and Horror Literature: 1980 (1983)
 The Year's Scholarship in Science Fiction, Fantasy and Horror Literature: 1981 (1984)
 The Year's Scholarship in Science Fiction, Fantasy and Horror Literature: 1982 (1985)
 Science Fiction, Fantasy and Weird Fiction Magazines (1985) (with Mike Ashley) 
 Science Fiction: A Teacher's Guide & Resource Book (ed.) (1988)
 The Celebration of the Fantastic: Selected Papers from the Tenth Anniversary International Conference on the Fantastic in the Arts (1992) (with Csilla Bertha and Donald E. Morse)
 Fantasy and Horror (1999) (with Neil Barron)

Notes

References

 
 

1937 births
2020 deaths
American speculative fiction critics
American speculative fiction editors
American bibliographers
Science fiction editors
Science fiction critics